Donna Joy Missal is an American singer-songwriter from New Jersey.

Early life and career 
Missal's grandmother was a songwriter in the 1940s; her father was a musician in the 1980s. She recorded her own song "Keep Lying" in 2015, hoping other performers would cover it. Her version went viral and got 2.7 million plays on streaming services.  She released a number of other singles, and collaborated on a track with Macklemore in 2017. She released her debut album This Time, on September 7, 2018 through Harvest Records.

Personal life 
Missal is bisexual.

She has one brother, Steve Missal, who’s currently playing on tour with her. She also has 4 other sisters: Linda Missal, Kelley Missal, Becky  Missal, and Catherine Missal.

Discography

Studio albums

Extended plays

Singles

As a lead artist

Notes

References

Singer-songwriters from New Jersey
21st-century American women singers
LGBT people from New Jersey
American LGBT singers
American LGBT songwriters
Living people
Bisexual singers
Bisexual songwriters
Bisexual women
Year of birth missing (living people)